I. alba  may refer to:
 Ipomoea alba, the moonflower or moon vine, a flowering plant species native to tropical and subtropical regions of the New World, from northern Argentina to Mexico and Florida.
 Iphinopsis alba, a sea snail species

See also
 Alba (disambiguation)